Alcantarea odorata is a plant species in the genus Alcantarea. This species is endemic to Brazil.

References

odorata
Flora of Brazil